Sulfadoxine/pyrimethamine, sold under the brand name Fansidar, is a combination medication used to treat malaria. It contains sulfadoxine (a sulfonamide) and pyrimethamine (an antiprotozoal). For the treatment of malaria it is typically used along with other antimalarial medication such as artesunate. In areas of Africa with moderate to high rates of malaria, three doses are recommended during the second and third trimester of pregnancy.

Side effects include diarrhea, rash, itchiness, headache, and hair loss. Rarely a severe allergic reaction or rash such as toxic epidermal necrolysis, may occur. It is not generally recommended in people with a sulfonamide allergy or significant liver or kidney disease. It works by blocking malaria's ability to use folinic acid.

Sulfadoxine/pyrimethamine was initially approved for medical use in the United States in 1981. It is on the World Health Organization's List of Essential Medicines. It is not commercially available in the United States.

Medical uses

Malaria
It is approved in the United States as a treatment and preventive measure against malaria. The combination is considered to be more effective in treating malaria caused by Plasmodium falciparum than that caused by P. vivax, for which chloroquine is considered more effective, though in the absence of a species-specific diagnosis, the sulfadoxine-pyrimethamine combination may be indicated. Due to side effects, however, it is no longer recommended as a routine preventive, but only to treat serious malaria infections or to prevent them in areas where other drugs may not work. However, it is recommended by the World Health Organization (WHO) for seasonal preventative use in children when combined with amodiaquine.

Other
It has also be used as a treatment and prophylactic measure for toxoplasmosis and Pneumocystis jiroveci pneumonia.

Adverse effects
Adverse effects by incidence include:

Common (>1% frequency):
 Hypersensitivity reactions (e.g. itchiness, contact dermatitis, and hives)
 Myelosuppression
 Gastrointestinal effects (e.g. nausea, vomiting, and diarrhoea)
 Headache

Rare (<1% frequency):

 Stevens–Johnson syndrome
 Toxic epidermal necrolysis
 Agranulocytosis
 Aplastic anaemia
 Disorder of haematopoietic structure
 Drug-induced eosinophilia
 Thrombocytopaenia
 Liver necrosis
 Hepatitis
 Jaundice
 Hepatomegaly
 Nephrotoxicity

Unknown frequency:

 Weight loss
 Abdominal cramps
 Hair loss
 Photosensitivity
 Fatigue
 Fever
 Polyneuritis
 Atrophic glossitis
 Gastritis

 Abnormal liver function test results (e.g. elevated serum ALT, AST, alkaline phosphatase, and bilirubin concentrations)

Contraindications
Use of this drug is contraindicated in: 
 Megaloblastic anaemia caused by folate deficiency
 Hypersensitivity to pyrimethamine, sulfonamides, or any ingredient in the formulation
 Repeated prophylactic (prolonged) use in patients with kidney or liver failure or blood dyscrasias
 Infants <2 months of age
 Prophylaxis in pregnancy at term
 Prophylaxis in nursing women
 Acute porphyria

Pharmacology
Sulfadoxine is a sulfonamide antibiotic that competes with p-aminobenzoic acid in the biosynthesis of folate. Pyrimethamine serves as a selective inhibitor of protozoal dihydrofolate reductase, hence preventing the synthesis of tetrahydrofolate — the active form of folate. A great degree of synergy occurs between the two drugs due to their inhibition of two different steps in the biosynthesis of tetrahydrofolate.

See also 
 Trimethoprim/sulfamethoxazole (co-trimoxazole)

References

External links 
 

Antimalarial agents
Hoffmann-La Roche brands
World Health Organization essential medicines
Wikipedia medicine articles ready to translate